The men's triple jump event at the 1987 Summer Universiade was held at the Stadion Maksimir in Zagreb on 15 and 17 July 1987.

Medalists

Results

Qualification

Final

References

Athletics at the 1987 Summer Universiade
1987